Eugoa conflua is a moth of the family Erebidae first described by George Thomas Bethune-Baker in 1904. It is found in New Guinea.

References

conflua
Moths described in 1904